Lilika is a 1970 Yugoslav drama film directed by Branko Pleša. The film won the Golden Leopard at the Locarno International Film Festival.

Cast
 Dragana Kalaba as Milica Sandić - Lilika
 Branko Pleša as Counsellor
 Ljerka Draženović as Aunt
 Nada Kasapić
 Tamara Miletić as Mother
 Gizela Vuković
 Vesna Krajina
 Danilo Stojković as Stepfather
 Ljiljana Kontić as Đurđica
 Vladimir Pevec as Peca
 Sanja Jeremić
 Nada Šarac

References

External links
 

1970 films
1970 drama films
Serbian drama films
Serbo-Croatian-language films
Serbian-language films
Golden Leopard winners
Yugoslav drama films